Charles Jeremiah Wells (25 January 1799 – 17 February 1879) was an English poet.

Family
His parents were James Turner Wells (1772 - 1838) and Jane Sears (? - 1832).  On 15 July 1825 he married Emily Jane Hill (1807 - 1872), the daughter of a school-teacher.
Their children were:
Emily Jane (1827 - 1885)
Anna Maria (1828 - 1903)
Florence Hazlitt (1832 - 1835)
Charles James Llewellyn (1834 - 1836)
Florence Llewellyn (1837 - ?)
 Charles De Ville Wells (b. 1841 -1922), gambler, one of the men who broke the bank at Monte Carlo

Life

He was born in Pentonville, London, on 25 January 1799. He was educated at Cowden Clarke's school at Edmonton, with Tom Keats, the younger brother of the poet, and with R. H. Horne. He became acquainted with John Keats, and was the friend who sent him some roses, to whom Keats wrote a sonnet on 29 June 1816: "When, O Wells! thy roses came to me, My sense with their deliciousness was spelled; Soft voices had they, that, with tender plea, Whisper'd of peace and truth and friendliness unquelled."

Wells soon afterwards played a practical joke on the dying Tom Keats, and reappears in the elder poet's correspondence as "that degraded Wells." Both with Keats and Reynolds, Wells was in direct literary emulation, and his early writings were the result of this. In 1822 he published Stories after Nature--or rather, in the manner of Boccaccio, tempered by that of Leigh Hunt. At the close of 1823, under the pseudonym of H. L. Howard, appeared the Biblical drama Of Joseph and his Brethren (dated 1824). For the next three years Wells saw William Hazlitt, as he said, every night, but in 1827 the two men were estranged. When Hazlitt died, in September 1830, Wells took Horne to see his dead friend, and afterwards raised a monument to the memory of Hazlitt in St Anne's Church, Soho.

His two books passed almost unnoticed. Wells was now practising as a solicitor in London, but he thought that his health was failing and proceeded to South Wales, where he occupied himself with shooting, fishing and writing poetry until 1835, when he removed to Broxbourne in Hertfordshire.

In 1841 he left England, never to set foot in it again. He settled at Quimper, in Brittany, where he lived for some years. A story called Claribel appeared in 1845, and one or two slight sketches later, but several tragedies and a great deal of miscellaneous verse belonging to these years are lost. Wells stated in a letter to Horne (November 1877) that he had composed eight or ten volumes of poetry during his life, but that, having failed to find a publisher for any of them, he burned the manuscripts at his wife's death. The only work he had retained was a revised form of Joseph and his Brethren, which was praised in 1838 by Thomas Wade, and again, with great warmth, by Horne, in his New Spirit of the Age, in 1844. The drama was then once more forgotten, until in 1863 it was read and praised by Dante Gabriel Rossetti.

The tide turned at last; Joseph and his Brethren became a kind of shibboleth—a rite of initiation into  poetic culture. Algernon Charles Swinburne wrote a study of it in the Fortnightly Review in 1875, and the drama itself was reprinted in 1876. Between 1876 and 1878 Wells added various scenes, which came in the possession of Buxton Fornian, who published one of them in 1895. After leaving Quimper, Wells went to reside at Marseilles, where he held a professorial chair.

Swinburne said that there are lines in Wells "which might more naturally be mistaken, even by an expert, for the work of the young Shakespeare, than any to be gathered elsewhere in the fields of English poetry." In 1909 a reprint was published of Joseph and his Brethren, with Swinburne's essay, and reminiscences by Walter Theodore Watts-Dunton.

Notes

References
Tatchell, Molly: Charles Jeremiah Wells (1800–1879). In The Keats-Shelley Memorial Bulletin, No. XXII, 1971, pp. 7–17.

External links

1799 births
1879 deaths
English male poets
19th-century English poets
19th-century English male writers